Hanover Township, Nebraska may refer to the following places:

 Hanover Township, Adams County, Nebraska
 Hanover Township, Gage County, Nebraska

See also
Hanover Township (disambiguation)

Nebraska township disambiguation pages